Orlan Pliny Whitcomb (December 18, 1831 – February 7, 1898) was an American farmer and politician.

Whitcomb was born in Granville, New York. He settled in Rochester, Minnesota Territory on a farm in 1855. He served as county treasurer from 1861 to 1869. Whitcomb served as Minnesota State Auditor from 1873 to 1882. He died in Mankato, Minnesota.

Notes

External links

1831 births
1898 deaths
People from Granville, New York
Politicians from Rochester, Minnesota
Farmers from Minnesota
County officials in Minnesota
State Auditors of Minnesota